This Podcast Will Kill You is an American podcast hosted by disease ecologists and epidemiologists Erin Welsh and Erin Allmann Updyke. Its first full-length episode was released on October 31, 2017. New episodes were released weekly until the second season, when they were released every two weeks. Each week a different disease is covered, the majority of which being infectious, but some exceptions have occurred, such as scurvy in episode 19.

"This Podcast Will Kill You" is part of the Exactly Right Podcast Network, created by the hosts of "My Favorite Murder."

Structure of Episodes 
Each episode is about an hour in duration and generally starts with a firsthand account of someone affected by the disease. After that, the hosts create a mixed drink that is connected to the disease, called a 'Quarantini', in a segment known as 'Quarantini time'. After this introduction, the biology of the disease is explained, then history, epidemiology, and finally, the disease's effect on the modern world. Generally, Welsh tells the history of the disease and Updyke explains the biology epidemiology. Finally, the hosts cite the sources used to present the information, and supply a link to their website where the sources can be found.

History 
Erin Allmann Updyke, co-host, has an M.S. from the University of Hawaii and a Ph.D. from the University of Illinois at Urbana-Champaign in epidemiology. Erin Welsh, co-host, has an M.S. in epidemiology from the University of Louisville and a Ph.D. in ecology from the University of Illinois at Urbana-Champaign. "The Erins," as they've coined themselves, started "This Podcast Will Kill You" because they felt that the medical knowledge that they have gained from their education rarely transfers out of the academia world. They wanted to make medical knowledge more accessible and easier to understand to the general public, without diluting it. Their first episode aired on October 31, 2017. In 2018, prior to launching Season 2, "This Podcast Will Kill You" joined The Exactly Right Network. In doing so, their downloads rose four times. The show was nominated for a 2019 Webby Award in the Science and Education Podcasts category. In 2020, they started a special series of episodes focusing on the COVID-19 Pandemic.

List of Episodes

Season 1

Season 2

Season 3

Season 4

COVID-19 Series
To discuss the ongoing COVID-19 pandemic, the podcast introduced "The Anatomy of a Pandemic" series in which each episode tackles a particular aspect of COVID-19. This mini-series not only addresses the virus itself, but also addresses how it can impact mental health and cause societal disarray. The series reached its tentative end with Chapter 19.

See also 

 List of history podcasts

References 

Science podcasts
2017 podcast debuts
Audio podcasts
Educational podcasts
American podcasts